Endless Wire is the Canadian singer Gordon Lightfoot's thirteenth original album, released in 1978 on Warner Bros. Records (#3149).

The closing track, "The Circle is Small", was a re-recording of a song from Lightfoot's fourth album, Back Here on Earth (1968).

In the USA, Endless Wire peaked at #22 on the Billboard pop chart and #14 on the country chart. "The Circle is Small" peaked at #3 on the adult contemporary chart, #33 on the pop chart and #92 on the country chart. It reached #1 on the Canadian Adult Contemporary chart. "Dreamland" peaked at #100 on the country chart. "Daylight Katy" reached #16 on the adult contemporary chart and also charted in the UK at #41.

Track listing
All songs written and composed by Gordon Lightfoot.

"Daylight Katy" – 4:18
"Sweet Guinevere" – 3:16
"Hangdog Hotel Room" – 2:35
"If There's a Reason" – 4:52
"Endless Wire" – 4:07
"Dreamland" – 2:53
"Songs the Minstrel Sang" – 2:49
"Sometimes I Don't Mind" – 2:53
"If Children Had Wings" – 3:50
"The Circle Is Small (I Can See It in Your Eyes)" – 4:03

Chart performance

Personnel
Gordon Lightfoot - vocals, six and twelve-string guitar, high-string guitar, electric guitar
Terry Clements - lead guitar
Rick Haynes - bass guitar
Tom Szczesniak - bass guitar
Pee Wee Charles - steel guitar
Red Shea - guitar
Barry Keane - drums, percussion
Doug Riley - orchestration, piano
Jack Zaza - alto saxophone, tenor saxophone, shakers, baritone sax, bass clarinet, English horn, alto flute, harmonica, harmonium
Mitch Clarke - bassoon

References

External links
Album lyrics and chords

Gordon Lightfoot albums
1978 albums
Albums produced by Lenny Waronker
Reprise Records albums